Mediator of RNA polymerase II transcription subunit 28 is an enzyme that in humans is encoded by the MED28 gene. It forms part of the Mediator complex.

Function 

Subunit Med28 of the Mediator may function as a scaffolding protein within Mediator by maintaining the stability of a submodule within the head module, and components of this submodule act together in a gene-regulatory programme to suppress smooth muscle cell differentiation. Thus, mammalian Mediator subunit Med28 functions as a repressor of smooth muscle-cell differentiation, which could have implications for disorders associated with abnormalities in smooth muscle cell growth and differentiation, including atherosclerosis, asthma, hypertension, and smooth muscle tumours.

Interactions 

MED28 has been shown to interact with Merlin, Grb2 and MED26.

See also 
Mediator complex

References

Further reading 

 
 
 
 
 
 
 
 

Protein families